The Lake Forest Foresters football team, representing Lake Forest College, is an NCAA Division III college football team and member of the Midwest Conference. Lake Forest played its first intercollegiate games in 1882, with a pair of games against Northwestern University.

Playoff appearances

NCAA Division III
The Foresters have appeared in the Division III playoffs three times, with an overall record of 0–3.

References

External links
 

 
American football teams established in 1882
1882 establishments in Illinois